Crooked Earth is a 2001 New Zealand film directed by Sam Pillsbury and starring Temuera Morrison. The film opened to negative reviews and performed poorly at the box office.

Plot
The film follows Will Bastion (Morrison) as he returns home from the army after 20 years to bury his father. Upon returning home, tradition dictates that Will must take the tribal chief position. Due to his disinterest in the role, his brother Kahu (Makoare) takes charge as he appoints himself with the position. Faced with Kahu's drug-dealing and radical views, Bastion must decide if he should act.

Cast

 Temuera Morrison as Will Bastion 
 Lawrence Makoare as Kahu Bastion 
 Jaime Passier-Armstrong as Ripeka Bastion  
 Quinton Hita as Api
 Nancy Brunning as Marama
 Sydney Jackson as Pettigrew 
 George Henare as Tipene 
 Calvin Tuteao as Sergeant Ropiha 
 Stan Wolfgramm as Timo

References

External links
 Crooked Earth at NZVideos.org

 NZ On Screen page

2001 films
2001 drama films
New Zealand drama films
Films about Māori people
Films directed by Sam Pillsbury